The National Election Pool (NEP) is a consortium of American news organizations formed in 2003 to provide exit polling information for US elections, replacing the Voter News Service which had failed disastrously in 2002.  

The system produced skewed results in the 2004 US presidential election and in the 2016 presidential elections.

As of 2017, member companies were ABC News, CBS News, CNN, and NBC News; Fox News and the Associated Press formerly were part of the Pool, but left in 2017 due to plans to conduct their own exit polls and other experimental alternatives to gauge voter sentiment. The pool contracts with Edison Research to conduct the exit polling and to perform vote tabulations.

The organizers of the pool insist that the purpose of their quick collection of exit poll data is not to determine if an election is flawed, but rather to project winners of races.  Despite past problems, they note that none of their members has incorrectly called a winner since the current system was put in place. However, to avoid the premature leaking of data, collection is now done in a "Quarantine Room" at an undisclosed location in New York.  All participants are stripped of outside communications devices until it is time for information to be released officially.

See also
Warren Mitofsky

References

External links
Edison Research exit poll page

News agencies based in the United States
Media cooperatives
Cooperatives in the United States